Tătărăștii de Sus is a commune in Teleorman County, Muntenia, Romania. It is composed of three villages: Dobreni, Tătărăștii de Sus, and Udupu.

The commune lies in the Wallachian Plain, on the banks of the Teleorman River. It is located in the northern part of the county, on the border with Argeș County.

References

Communes in Teleorman County
Localities in Muntenia